Norman Frederick Ness (born April 15, 1933) is an American geophysicist. He worked at the University of California, Los Angeles.

From 1966 to 1986 he was director of the Laboratory of Extraterrestrial Physics at the Goddard Space Flight Center.

In 1987 he became director of the Bartol Research Institute at the University of Delaware.

References

1933 births
Living people
People from Springfield, Massachusetts
American geophysicists
Massachusetts Institute of Technology alumni
University of California, Los Angeles faculty